The 1919 Quebec general election was held on June 23, 1919, to elect members of the 15th Legislative Assembly of Quebec, Canada.  The incumbent Quebec Liberal Party, led by Lomer Gouin, was re-elected, defeating the Quebec Conservative Party, led by Arthur Sauvé.

Gouin, who had held office since 1905, resigned precisely one year after the election to make way for his successor Louis-Alexandre Taschereau.  Gouin himself had originally come to power in much the same way, after his predecessor Simon-Napoléon Parent resigned soon after winning his final election.

Results

|-
!rowspan="2" colspan="2"|Party
!rowspan="2"|Party leader
!rowspan="2"|Candidates
!colspan="3"|Seats
!colspan="4"|Popular Vote
|-
!1916
!Elected
!±
!#
!±
!%
!± (pp)
|-

| Lomer Gouin
|79
|75
|74
|1
|67,292
| 58,974
| 51.91
| 8.66
|-

| Arthur Sauvé
| 20
| 6
| 5 
| 1
| 21,990
| 73,147
| 16.96
| 18.13
|-
| style="background-color:#EEBBBB;" |
| style="text-align:left;" | Parti ouvrier
| 
|7
|–
|2
|2
|12,506
|10,674
|9.65
|8.77
|-

| 
|22
|–
|–
|–
|21,902
|14,695
|16.88
|13.42
|-
| style="background-color:lightcoral;" |
| style="text-align:left;" |Liberal-Democrat
| 
|5
|–
|–
|–
|4,399
|
|3.38
|
|-

| 
|1
|–
|–
|–
|1,457
|
|1.12
|
|-
! colspan="3" style="text-align:left;" | Total
| 134
! " colspan="3"| 81
! " colspan="2"| 129,636
! " colspan="2"| 100%
|-
| colspan="7" style="text-align:left;" | Rejected ballots
| 1,448
| 1,319
| colspan="2"|
|-
| colspan="7" style="text-align:left;" | Voter turnout
| 131,184
| 80,035
| 55.11
| 7.44
|-
| colspan="7" style="text-align:left;" | Registered electors (contested ridings only)
| 238,052
| 99,644
| colspan="2"|
|-
| colspan="5" style="text-align:left;" | Candidates returned by acclamation
| 45
| 19
| colspan="4"|
|}

See also
 List of Quebec premiers
 Politics of Quebec
 Timeline of Quebec history
 List of Quebec political parties
 15th Legislative Assembly of Quebec

Further reading

References

Quebec general election
Elections in Quebec
General election
Quebec general election